ISIC may refer to:

 International Space Innovation Centre, a facility of the UK Space Agency
 International Standard Industrial Classification, a United Nations industry classification system
 International Student Identity Card, an internationally accepted proof of student status